JS Harusame (DD-102) is the second ship of s. She was commissioned on 24 March 1997.

Design
The hull design was completely renovated from first-generation destroyers. In addition to increasing the size in order to reduce the underwater radiation noise, both superstructure and hull was inclined to reduce the radar cross-section. However, there is no angled tripod mainmast like the one of the American  because of the heavy weather of the Sea of Japan in winter. Destroyers built under the First Defense Build-up Plan, including the former , adopted a unique long forecastle style called "Oranda-zaka".

The engine arrangement is COGAG as same as Asagiri class, but a pair of engines are updated to Spey SM1C. And the remaining one pair are replaced by LM2500, same as Kongō class.

Construction and career
Harusame was laid down on 11 August 1994 at Mitsui Engineering and Shipbuilding Tamano as the 1992 plan and launched on 16 October 1995. Commissioned on 24 March 1997, the vessel was incorporated into the 8th Escort Corps of the 4th Escort Corps and deployed to Sasebo.

From 17 to 29 September and 15 October to 23 October 2019, Japan-Australia joint training (Japan-Australia Trident) was held in the sea and airspace from the south of Kanto to the west of Kyushu via the area around Okinawa. On 24 November, the same year, she departed from Sasebo for the Gulf of Aden off the coast of Somalia as the 35th Expeditionary Piracy Action Water Corps. Due to the fact that some members of the ship completed their mission in late May 2020 and developed symptoms of suspected acute cholecystitis or acute cholangitis on their way back to Japan, they planned to return to Japan on 20 June, one day earlier. The vessel returned to port on 19 June.

On 22 May 2022, Harusame departed Sasebo for the Gulf of Aden as the 42nd Deployment Surface for Counter Piracy Enforcement. The vessel relieved .

Gallery

Citations

References 
 
 Saunders, Stephen. IHS Jane's Fighting Ships 2013-2014. Jane's Information Group (2003). 
 

1995 ships
Murasame-class destroyers (1994)
Ships built by Mitsui Engineering and Shipbuilding